"Rock & Roll" (sometimes spelled Rock 'n' Roll) is a song by the Velvet Underground, originally appearing on their 1970 album Loaded. The song was written by the Velvets' then-leader Lou Reed, who continued to incorporate the song into his own live performances years later as a solo artist.

The song recounts the advent of rock & roll, telling the story of a girl named Jenny whose "life was saved by rock and roll."

In the liner notes to the Velvet Underground's box set Peel Slowly and See, Lou Reed wrote, Rock and Roll' is about me. If I hadn't heard rock and roll on the radio, I would have had no idea there was life on this planet. Which would have been devastating - to think that everything, everywhere was like it was where I come from. That would have been profoundly discouraging. Movies didn't do it for me. TV didn't do it for me. It was the radio that did it."

The song also appears on the albums 1969: The Velvet Underground Live; Live MCMXCIII; Loaded: Fully Loaded Edition; American Poet; Another View; Rock 'n' Roll Animal; Live in Italy; Rock and Roll: an Introduction to The Velvet Underground.; Rock and Roll Diary: 1967–1980.

Notable covers and pop culture uses
"Rock & Roll" has appeared in a number of films, including A Guide to Recognizing Your Saints, Rock 'n' Roll High School and SLC Punk!

A clip of the Velvet Underground performing the song is played on completion of the Rock & Roll wonder in Civilization IV. In addition, the quote about researching the technology "Radio," read by Leonard Nimoy, is "...then one fine morning she puts on a New York station.... You know, her life was saved by rock & roll." The quote is credited to Lou Reed.

Mitch Ryder's band Detroit, which featured Lou Reed's future guitarist Steve Hunter, performed one of the first cover versions of the song in 1971, changing the lyric "New York station" to "Detroit station".  Other artists to cover the song include The Runaways, changing the aforementioned lyric to "L.A. station". The band Jane's Addiction, though also from Los Angeles, uses Reed's original "New York station" in its cover version of the song.

References

1970 songs
The Runaways songs
The Velvet Underground songs
Songs written by Lou Reed
Songs about rock music
Songs about radio